Tumski Bridge is a steel bridge over the north branch of the Oder river in Wrocław, Poland. Constructed in 1889 it replaced an old wooden bridge to connect Ostrów Tumski and Wyspa Piaskowa. Until 1945, its name was Dombrücke. 

It is an old road bridge now open to pedestrians only.

Tumski Bridge is also called Lovers Bridge, Cathedral Bridge or Green Bridge. It's a place of enamoured tradition for lovers. The bridge is full of love locks which lovers leave to cherish their feelings. An important part of the ceremony is to throw the key into the Odra river. 

In 1992 it was comprehensively renovated. During the renovation the original deck covering of Zores sections was replaced by an orthotropic deck.

External links 

Bridges in Wrocław
Tourist attractions in Wrocław
Pedestrian bridges in Poland
Steel bridges
Bridges completed in 1889